Sohum Shah is an India  actor, producer, and entrepreneur who works in Hindi films. He made his firstand screen appearance in 2009 with the film Baabarr, where he played the antagonist and in 2012 with the National Award-winning film Ship of Theseus which was produced under his banner, Recyclewala Films. Following his debut, Shah featured in Talvar (2015) and Simran (2017). His film Tumbbad received heavy critical acclaim.

Life and career 
Sohum Shah was born in Sri Ganganagar (Rajasthan). After establishing his real estate business he shifted to Mumbai to make films. He started his own production house, Recyclewala Films, to create content-driven film. His first film was the critically acclaimed Ship of Theseus, where he played the role of a socially incognizant stockbroker. He won a National Award for Best Producer for Ship of Theseus. Next, he was offered the role of a cop in Meghna Gulzar's Talvar, based on the 2008 Noida double murder case. In 2017, Shah was cast alongside Kangana Ranaut in Hansal Mehta's Simran. And the project Shah worked on for 6-7 years, his most ambitious project till date, Tumbbad, released on 12 October 2018 and garnered rave reviews by the critics and audience alike. Sohum Shah is currently in Rajasthan for the shoot of one of his upcoming projects, Reema Kagti’s web show, ‘Fallen’.

Filmography

Recognition 
Shah has won a National Award for his performance in Ship of Theseus. His produced film Tumbbad is first Indian film ever to be screened as the opening film at Venice International Film Festival (44th edition)

References

External links 
 

Living people
Indian male film actors
Male actors from Mumbai
Male actors in Hindi cinema
Year of birth missing (living people)